Stephen Douglas "Steve" Harkey (born August 3, 1949) is a former American football running back in the National Football League. He played for the New York Jets. He played collegiately for the Georgia Tech football team.

External links
New York Jets bio

1949 births
Living people
Players of American football from Atlanta
American football running backs
Georgia Tech Yellow Jackets football players
New York Jets players